Heather Miriam Watson (born 19 May 1992) is a professional tennis player. A former British No. 1, Watson has won nine titles over her career, including the mixed-doubles title at the 2016 Wimbledon Championships partnering Henri Kontinen, making her the first British woman to win a major title since Jo Durie in 1991, and the first to win a Wimbledon title since Durie in 1987. In October 2012, Watson won her first WTA Tour singles title at the Japan Women's Open, becoming the first British woman to win a WTA Tour singles title since Sara Gomer in 1988.

In her junior career, Watson won the US Open and a gold medal at the 2008 Commonwealth Youth Games. She reached No. 3 in the world on the ITF Junior Circuit.

Early life and junior career
Heather Watson was born in Guernsey to Michelle and Ian Watson. Her mother is from Papua New Guinea and her father is British, and was the managing director of Guernsey Electricity from 1995 until retirement in 2010. She has one brother and two sisters. Watson started playing tennis at the age of seven, and at age twelve she went to the Nick Bollettieri Tennis Academy in Florida.

In 2006, Watson won the British Under-14 Championship. The following year she won the British Under-16 Championship, and reached the semifinals of the British Under-18 Championship. She lost in the under-18 semifinals again in 2008 to eventual winner Tara Moore. In October, Watson travelled to Pune in India to compete at the 2008 Commonwealth Youth Games. There she won the gold medal, winning the final against Kyra Shroff. Mother Michelle left her job in 2008 to travel full-time with her daughter around the World Junior Circuit.

Watson played her first senior tournament in March 2009 – the $25k Jersey Open, but lost in the second round to Katie O'Brien. At the beginning of July, she became the highest-ranked British junior, overtaking Laura Robson. She achieved her first senior women's world ranking on 27 July 2009, entering at No. 756. She won her first senior title at the Frinton $10K tournament. Watson beat Anna Fitzpatrick in the final. At the 2009 US Open, Watson was seeded 11th for the girls' singles. She reached the quarterfinals on 10 September before rain interrupted the tournament schedule. The tournament moved indoors and Watson beat second seed Noppawan Lertcheewakarn in the quarterfinal on 12 September. She played her semifinal on the same day and was victorious against Daria Gavrilova to reach the final, where she faced doubles partner Yana Buchina. Playing on court 7, Watson won in straight sets.

At the 2009 French Open, Watson and her partner, as the third seeds, reached the girls' doubles final where she and Tímea Babos faced the second-seeded pair of Noppawan Lertcheewakarn and Elena Bogdan and were beaten in a match tie-break. Partnering Yana Buchina, that year they were the seventh seed at the Australian girls' doubles and sixth seed at the US Open girls' doubles, but they lost in the first round at both tournaments. At Wimbledon, she teamed up with Magda Linette and they were seeded sixth in the girls' doubles but eliminated in the second round.

Junior Grand Slam results
Australian Open: QF (2009)
French Open: 1R (2009)
Wimbledon: 1R (2008, 2009)
US Open: W (2009)

Junior Grand Slam finals

Singles: 1 (title)

Doubles: 1 (runner-up)

Professional career

2009
Watson began competing on the ITF Women's Circuit in March when she entered the qualifying tournament for the $10k event in Bath, Somerset, but failed to win a match. She entered her next tournament, a $25k event in Jersey, on a wildcard and beat compatriot Jade Curtis in the first round. She was defeated by another Britain, Katie O'Brien, in round two. In July, she reached her first ITF semifinal as a qualifier in the $10k grass-court tournament in Felixstowe before losing to Anna Smith. She went on to qualify for the next tournament she entered and again faced Smith in the semifinals; however this time Watson was victorious and went on to beat Anna Fitzpatrick in the final to win her first ITF title. Continuing to compete on the ITF Circuit for the rest of the season, Watson beat Melanie South in round one of a $50k in Barnstaple in October, before being defeated by Kristina Mladenovic in round two. She ended the 2009 season with a singles ranking of 588.

2010: Turned professional, Grand Slam debut
Watson began 2010 with a wildcard into the $25k event in Sutton, London, where she made the quarterfinals. She immediately flew to the $100k Midland Classic, losing to qualifier and fellow 17-year-old Beatrice Capra in the first round. Two weeks later, she entered the $25k event in Hammond, Louisiana. Watson qualified and went on to reach her second quarterfinal of the year, defeating former world No. 7 and two-time Grand Slam semifinalist, Nicole Vaidišová, and fifth seed Monique Adamczak, en route. The following week, Watson entered another $25k event in Clearwater, Florida. In the final qualifying round, she lost to fellow Brit Georgie Stoop, before being handed a lucky loser spot in the main draw and defeating Anna Tatishvili in the first round. She lost to Zhou Yimiao in round two. Watson was then given a wildcard into the main draw of the Miami Open, but lost to Tsvetana Pironkova in the first round. This was the first time in her career that Watson competed on the WTA Tour. In April, she reached the quarterfinals of a $25k event, this one in Jackson, Mississippi. Following this, she qualified for the WTA event in Charleston, South Carolina, before losing to Elena Vesnina in the first round.

Watson's grass-court season began at the Birmingham Classic which she entered courtesy of a wildcard, losing to Alla Kudryavtseva in the first round. At the Eastbourne International, Watson qualified for the main draw by defeating Anna Smith, Tsvetana Pironkova and Bojana Jovanovski. Watson defeated world No. 48, Aleksandra Wozniak, in the first round. In the second round, she was defeated by former top-10 player Victoria Azarenka. She then entered the first Grand Slam tournament of her career, after receiving a wildcard into the main draw of Wimbledon. Watson met Romina Oprandi in the first round and lost in three sets. Moving back onto hardcourts, her next tournament was a $25k tournament in Wrexham. She defeated four fellow British players (including Anna Fitzpatrick and Naomi Broady) on her way to the final, where she defeated former top-30 player Sania Mirza to win her second ITF title. After this, Watson continued to compete on the ITF Circuit and in the qualifying rounds for WTA events. In September, at the $75k tournament in Shrewsbury, she defeated world No. 90 and former top-30 player, Sabine Lisicki, in straight sets before losing in the quarterfinals to Eva Birnerová. In October 2010, she was seeded fifth for the women's singles at the Commonwealth Games, taking the rare opportunity to represent Guernsey. She eventually lost to top seed, Anastasia Rodionova of Australia, in the quarterfinals. Partnering Patrick Ogier, Watson also reached the quarterfinals of the mixed doubles, where they were defeated by the third seeds Sarah Borwell and Ken Skupski, representing England.

2011: First major match win at the French Open & top 100 debut

Watson began the season by qualifying for the Auckland Open. She continued her winning streak in the main tournament and beat ninth seed Carla Suárez Navarro to get into the quarterfinals, where she lost to Peng Shuai. She also made the quarterfinals of the doubles tournament, partnering Kurumi Nara.

Watson then moved on to the Australian Open, where she beat Kristina Mladenovic in the first round of qualifying. She then qualified for the Cellular South Cup, beating Andrea Hlaváčková and Stéphanie Foretz Gacon in the first and second rounds respectively to reach her second quarterfinal of the year. She lost to Evgeniya Rodina. She also reached the quarterfinals of the doubles tournament partnering Anna-Lena Grönefeld.

On 3 April 2011, Watson won two matches to qualify for the Charleston Open, where she lost a close three-set match to Christina McHale in the first round.

Watson next attempted to qualify for the Estoril Open. In the first round of qualifying, she beat former world No. 17, Karolina Šprem. She went on to beat Katarzyna Piter in the second round of qualifying, but eventually lost to Tamira Paszek in the final qualifying round.

Watson qualified for the French Open on her debut. She beat Raluca Olaru and Sally Peers in the first and second rounds, respectively, to reach the final round, where she defeated Stefanie Vögele to gain a place in the main draw for the first time. This was the first time a British woman had qualified for the French Open since Kate Brasher, the daughter of Shirley Bloomer and Chris Brasher, in 1983. She played French wildcard Stéphanie Foretz Gacon in the first round and won. By winning this match, Watson became the first British woman since Clare Wood in 1994 to reach the second round of the French Open. The victory saw her break into the top 100 for the first time. She lost to 16th seed Kaia Kanepi in the second round.

Watson continued her good form entering the grass-court season when she beat 15th seed Chanelle Scheepers in the first round of the Birmingham Classic. She followed this up by beating Misaki Doi in the second round. However, she lost to third seed and eventual semifinalist Peng Shuai in the third round.

On 22 June 2011, Watson played Mathilde Johansson in her first round match in the Wimbledon Championships, winning the opening set before suffering an arm injury in the second set. Johansson then went on to win in three sets. On 25 June 2011, she and her mixed doubles partner Ross Hutchins beat Marcelo Melo and Rennae Stubbs in the mixed doubles.

On 29 August 2011, in the first round of the US Open, Watson lost in three sets to former champion Maria Sharapova. After the match, Sharapova stated "There's no doubt that she's a great up-and-coming player".

2012: Wimbledon third round, maiden WTA Tour title, top 50 debut
At the start of 2012, Watson suffered an ankle sprain. She then lost in the first round of the Australian Open to the eventual champion Victoria Azarenka.

Watson was selected for the British Fed Cup Team to play in the Europe/Africa Group-1 match at Eilat, Israel on 1–4 February 2012. In the group stages she played doubles with Laura Robson, defeating pairs from Portugal and the Netherlands and Israel in the group stages. Robson and Watson were not required to play their doubles in the play-off match against Austria as Anne Keothavong and Elena Baltacha won their singles rubbers, and the 2–0 lead qualified the team for a place in the World Group II promotion play-off in April 2012.

Watson won three rounds in qualifying for the French Open at Roland Garros in May 2012. She then defeated Elena Vesnina in the first round, matching her 2011 result in the tournament. In the second round, she was defeated by the 25th seed Julia Görges of Germany.

In June, ranked No. 103, Watson defeated world No. 52, Iveta Benešová, in her first singles win at 2012 Wimbledon Championships. She then beat Jamie Hampton, becoming the first British woman since 2002 to reach the third round of Wimbledon. In the third round, Watson lost to the third seed and eventual runner-up, Agnieszka Radwańska.

At the Stanford Classic, Watson lost in the second round to world No. 37, Yanina Wickmayer, after a victory over the world No. 49, Sloane Stephens. She won the doubles competition of the Stanford Classic, where she played with Marina Erakovic to beat Vania King and Jarmila Gajdošová in a second set tiebreak. This was her first title on the full WTA Tour. At the Carlsbad Open, she beat Eleni Daniilidou to set up a second round meeting with qualifier Chan Yung-jan. However, she lost the match.

She received an ITF wildcard into the singles tournament at the London Olympics, where she defeated Sílvia Soler Espinosa, before losing her second-round match to Maria Kirilenko. She also played ladies' doubles in the Olympic tournament with Laura Robson, losing in the first round to Angelique Kerber and Sabine Lisicki. Her next tournament was the Texas Open where in the singles she lost to Yanina Wickmayer in the first round. However, she went on to win the doubles competition alongside Erakovic for her second WTA doubles title of the year.

Watson received automatic entry into the main draw of the US Open but was beaten in the first round by Li Na. In the doubles, she and Erakovic had to retire in the first round. After this she played in the Bell Challenge and lost in the first round to Mona Barthel. In the doubles tournament, playing with Alicja Rosolska, Watson reached the final, but they lost to Tatjana Malek and Kristina Mladenovic. She then qualified for the Pan Pacific Open and beat Sabine Lisicki in the first round, but then lost to Maria Sharapova.

Watson made a WTA Tour singles final for the first time in her career at the HP Open where she beat Polona Hercog, sixth seed Anabel Medina Garrigues, Pauline Parmentier and Misaki Doi. In the final, she saved four match points to beat Chang Kai-chen in a match lasting 3 hours and 12 minutes. With this win, Watson attained a top-50 ranking for the first time in her career, at the same time overtaking compatriot Laura Robson as the British No. 1. Watson also became the first Briton to win a WTA singles title since Sara Gomer in 1988. She also made the doubles final in the same event with Kimiko Date-Krumm, but lost to Raquel Kops-Jones and Abigail Spears.

2013: Australian Open third round & top 40

Watson began the year in the top 50 and therefore qualified for the Australian Open. She reached the second round for the first time in her career thanks to a three-set victory against the Romanian Alexandra Cadanțu. In the second round, she came back from trailing Ksenia Pervak by a set and 6–3 in the tie break, to win in three sets. She faced world No. 4, Agnieszka Radwańska, in the third round, where she was beaten in two sets. This run saw Watson rise to a career-high world ranking of 40.

Watson's next tournament after the Australian Open was the Pattaya Open where she was the eighth seed. In the first round, she comfortably defeated Tímea Babos, setting up a second round meeting with Anastasija Sevastova, to whom she lost. She then competed in the Fed Cup, helping Great Britain reach a World Group II Play-off tie with victories over Tímea Babos of Hungary and Tsvetana Pironkova of Bulgaria in the Euro/Africa Group I Play-off.

Her next tournament was the 2013 U.S. National Indoor Tennis Championships in Memphis where she was seeded fourth. In the first round, she overcame a tense battle with world No. 109, Galina Voskoboeva. She then defeated Andrea Hlaváčková in another three-setter, before meeting Stefanie Vögele in the quarterfinals.

Watson was forced to miss Great Britain's Fed Cup Play-off against Argentina after contracting glandular fever. Her first game back after recovering was at the French Open, where she lost to Stefanie Vögele in three sets, saying after the match she knew it would be tough but that she was very disappointed.

Following the French Open, Watson moved her attention to the grass-court season, where she entered the Birmingham Classic. Seeded 14th, she defeated Melinda Czink in the first round, her first victory since returning from her illness. She lost in the following round to qualifier Alla Kudryavtseva. At the Eastbourne International, Watson upset world No. 27, Varvara Lepchenko, in the first round in two sets. At Wimbledon she lost in the first round to Madison Keys.

Before her US Open Series, Watson decided to change coaches by hiring Jeremy Bates and won her first post-Wimbledon match against wildcard Alexandra Mueller at the Washington Open. Watson then lost in the next round to fourth-seed Alizé Cornet, in straight sets.

2014: Third WTA doubles title

Watson had to qualify for WTA Tour events, starting with the Brisbane International. Having won three qualifying matches, she received a tough draw against ninth seed Dominika Cibulková (who subsequently went on to reach the Australian Open Final) where she lost in straight sets. Thereafter Watson failed to qualify for the Sydney International, losing in the second round of qualifying to Bethanie Mattek-Sands.

With many ranking points to defend from last year's tournament, it was vital that Watson qualified for the Australian Open. Watson was one of five British players aiming to qualify. She was the sole qualifier, joining Andy Murray and Laura Robson in the main draw. Like in Brisbane, Watson was given a tough draw as she faced 31st seed Daniela Hantuchová and lost in three sets.

In the Fed Cup Watson continued her impressive run winning all four of her singles rubbers in the Europe/Africa Zone. Despite her victories, which included two top 40 scalps defeating Yvonne Meusburger of Austria and Romanian world No. 26, Sorana Cîrstea, Britain failed to qualify for the World Group II Playoff.

Watson then proceeded to compete at the second-tier ITF Midland Classic. She won in straight sets Anna Tatishvili, Sofia Arvidsson and Olga Govortsova to advance to the final, where she defeated Ksenia Pervak to win her fourth ITF title. Partnering Tatishvili, she also reached the doubles final and won after a tough tiebreak.

Watson re-entered the WTA top 100 after victory at the Sparta Prague Open in May. Watson defeated three top-100 players – Klára Koukalová, Karolína Plíšková and Tímea Babos – en route to the final of the $100k event. Due to poor weather, Watson was forced to play her semifinal with Babos on the final's day. She claimed a two-set victory before defeating sixth seed Anna Karolína Schmiedlová (who had played most of her semifinal the day before) in the final.

Her impressive form carried over to the French Open where she came through three rounds of qualifying to reach the main draw. In the first round, Watson defeated Barbora Záhlavová-Strýcová in straight sets before falling to world No. 4, Simona Halep, in the second round.

From the French Open, she went to play at the Birmingham Classic where she lost to Alexandra Wozniak, even after holding three match points in the second set. She continued a strong grass-court season at Eastbourne, where she defeated Tsvetana Pironkova in her first round match, after dropping the first set. She then claimed her biggest win of her career, defeating sixth seed Flavia Pennetta, in three sets, dropping the first set on a tiebreak. After being given a walkover against Petra Kvitová, her great run came to an end losing in straight sets to Madison Keys, winning only four games.

From there, she headed to Wimbledon where she played Ajla Tomljanović and defeated her in straight sets. She then went on to play Angelique Kerber, the ninth seed, in the second round. After losing the first set, she played a strong second set to force the decider which she lost.

Watson won her third WTA Tour doubles title at the Baku Cup, partnering with Alexandra Panova. In the final, they crushed Raluca Olaru and Shahar Pe'er.

After the Baku Cup, Watson headed to the Rogers Cup. In the qualifying, she defeated Mirjana Lučić-Baroni in three sets before beating Tamira Paszek. In the main draw, she won against fellow qualifier Tereza Smitková and then caused an upset by defeating tenth seed Cibulková in a tough three-set match that included two tiebreaks. She was eventually defeated by eighth seed Victoria Azarenka.

She then went to qualify for the Cincinnati Open, easing past Kristýna Plíšková and Shahar Pe'er to reach the first round. She faced Zhang Shuai in the first round but she lost in a very tight three sets.

2015: Second WTA singles title, Wimbledon third round loss to Serena Williams
Watson won her second career WTA title at the 2015 Hobart International. She did not drop a set on her way to the title, beating Magdaléna Rybáriková, fifth seed Sloane Stephens, ninth seed Roberta Vinci, and eighth seed Alison Riske. She went on to beat Madison Brengle in straight sets in the final to win the event.

Watson then lost in the first round of the Australian Open to Tsvetana Pironkova. During the Indian Wells Open, she recorded wins over Julia Görges and Camila Giorgi to set up a meeting with world No. 8, Agnieszka Radwańska. She recorded her first top-ten win with a two-set victory over Radwańska to move into the fourth round for the first time, where she lost to Carla Suárez Navarro in three sets.

At Wimbledon, Watson beat former world No. 5, Daniela Hantuchová, to make it into the third round for the second time in her career, guaranteeing her winnings of £77,000. She was then pitted against the world No. 1, Serena Williams, and was two points away from winning, but lost in three sets in a match described by pundits as a "thriller". Following the match, Williams applauded Watson's efforts and went on to say that "she should have won the match". Watson's efforts at Wimbledon pushed her back up to world no. 55.

Over the course of the rest of the season, Watson's best result was a quarterfinal showing at the Hong Kong Open, where she lost to former Grand Slam champion Samantha Stosur.

2016: Third WTA singles title, Wimbledon mixed-doubles champion
Watson represented her nation at the Hopman Cup with Andy Murray. She was beaten by Caroline Garcia in the tie against France, but went on to win against Daria Gavrilova and Sabine Lisicki. Great Britain almost reached the final against Ukraine, but the Australia team of Daria Gavrilova and Nick Kyrgios won their tie against France, placing them ahead of Great Britain in the round-robin results.

As the world No. 53, Watson then started her season at the Hobart International, attempting to defend her title. The tournament was interrupted by multiple rain delays, with Watson losing in the quarterfinals, playing twice in one day. At the Australian Open, she was narrowly beaten in the first round by Tímea Babos.

In Mexico at the Monterrey Open, Watson defeated No. 2 seed Caroline Wozniacki and No. 4 seed Caroline Garcia on her way to the title, beating Kirsten Flipkens in the championship match for her third WTA title.

At the Miami Open, her strong form continued with two wins over higher-ranked players including world No. 22, Sloane Stephens, before a third-round defeat by world No. 5, Simona Halep.

On grass courts, Watson's second-round appearance at the Birmingham Classic with a win over Camila Giorgi resulted in her re-entry into the world's top 50.

At Wimbledon, Watson lost in the first round to Annika Beck in a match that spanned three days because of rain. However, she had greater success in the mixed doubles, which she won with Henri Kontinen in their maiden Grand Slam final. During their run to the title, Kontinen and Watson enjoyed victory over the defending champions Leander Paes and Martina Hingis, in the third round.

Watson represented Great Britain at the 2016 Summer Olympics reaching round two in both singles and doubles and the quarterfinals in mixed doubles.

At the US Open, Watson lost to qualifier and world No. 165, Richèl Hogenkamp.

By the season end, Watson was ranked world No. 77.

2017: Wimbledon third round
Starting the year at the Hopman Cup partnered with Daniel Evans, the duo were knocked out in the group stages, between them winning only one of nine matches. In Melbourne at the Australian Open, Watson beat seeded Samantha Stosur to get through to the second round.  She was the Europe/Africa Zone Group I 2017 winner of the Fed Cup Heart Award, which is awarded for commitment to their players team and the Fed Cup competition.

In May, Watson lost in straight sets to world No. 264, Alizé Lim, in the second round of the Cagnes-sur-Mer Challenger event.

At the French Open, Watson failed to qualify, losing to Richèl Hogenkamp in the third round of qualifying. She then was runner-up at an ITF tournament at Surbiton.
Watson failed to make it past the first round at Nottingham and at Birmingham.

She reached Eastbourne semifinals, defeating top-10 player Dominika Cibulková in the second round, Anastasia Pavlyuchenkova in the third and Barbora Strýcová in the quarterfinals, before falling to Caroline Wozniacki.
After reaching the third round at Wimbledon, defeating 18th seed Anastasija Sevastova, Watson only managed to win two WTA Tour main-draw matches during the rest of the season, losing in the first round of tournaments four times, including her seventh consecutive first-round loss at the US Open.

2018: Loss of form, major doubles quarterfinal at Wimbledon, back to singles top 100
Watson lost in the first round of the Australian Open to Yulia Putintseva. She then lost in the first round of qualifying for the St. Petersburg Trophy to No. 142, Roberta Vinci. Her poor form continued with three further consecutive first-round losses, at the Mexican Open, Indian Wells and Miami Open, respectively.

At Charleston, Watson lost in the first round to No. 118, Taylor Townsend.

In the April Fed Cup promotional play-off tie, she lost both her singles matches and the doubles match (with Johanna Konta), resulting in a 2–3 loss to Japan. These were her eighth and ninth consecutive singles match losses in 2018.
In late April, Watson lost her tenth consecutive singles match of 2018, losing in the first round of the Prague Open to world No. 86, Anna Karolína Schmiedlová.

In late May, she defeated Kateryna Bondarenko in the first round of the Nuremberg Cup. It was the first match Watson had managed to win since mid-January, bringing an end to a ten-match losing streak. She lost in straight sets to the world No. 203, Fanny Stollár, the following day.

As the top seed, Watson lost in the first round of the Surbiton Trophy to world No. 184, Gabriella Taylor; it was her eighth first-round loss in 2018 (in 12 tournaments).
Watson lost in three consecutive first-round matches during the grass-court season, at Birmingham, Eastbourne and Wimbledon.

Watson was docked a point for swearing as she and Tatjana Maria lost to Katerina Siniaková and Barbora Krejciková in the women's doubles quaterfinals in Wimbledon.

Heading into the US Open Series short of wins, Watson played at San Jose, where she beat Claire Liu before succumbing to Venus Williams. Watson showed signs of form when she reached the final of an ITF event in Canada, before losing to Misaki Doi. She carried this form into the US Open qualifying where she won three successive matches to reach the main draw. These were her first wins at the US Open since winning the girls' singles title at Flushing Meadows in 2009. However, Watson was unable to get her first ever senior main-draw win in New York as she lost in three sets to Ekaterina Makarova. Despite this, Watson reached her third semifinal of 2018 in Quebec, but she could not make the final as she lost a tight match against Pauline Parmentier. In spite of this loss, her upturn in results restored her place in the world's top 100.

2019-2020: Fourth WTA final, fourth WTA title in singles
In the second round of Wimbledon Championships, Watson lost to Anett Kontaveit, in straight sets.
In October 2019, she reached the final of the Tianjin Open, which she lost to Rebecca Peterson.

Her 2020 season started well, reaching the semifinals as a qualifier in Hobart. On her way to the semifinals, Watson defeated top seed Elise Mertens, before losing to eventual champion Elena Rybakina. She took this form to Melbourne and the Australian Open, where she defeated Kristýna Plíšková in the opening round, before losing to Mertens, 3–6, 0–6.

In the Fed Cup Play-offs, Watson represented Great Britain in their crunch tie away in Slovakia. She comfortably lost to Anna Karolína Schmiedlová in the opening tie, before beating Rebecca Sramkova on the following day. Great Britain eventually lost the tie 1–3, after Harriet Dart failed to defeat Schmiedlová.

In February 2020, Watson played at the Mexican Open in Acapulco, winning her fourth career WTA Tour singles title. She defeated CoCo Vandeweghe, Kateryna Bondarenko, Christina McHale and Wang Xiyu to reach the final, where she faced Canadian qualifier Leylah Fernandez. Watson won in three sets, clinching the match on her tenth championship point. The win propelled Watson back into the world's top 50 (No. 49) for the first time since 2016.

She participated in the Battle of the Brits Team Tennis event, held in London in late July, notching up a number of wins in singles and teaming up with Jamie Murray in mixed doubles.

When the WTA Tour resumed following the COVID-19 pause, Watson entered two hardcourt events leading up to the US Open, losing in the first round at both the Lexington and Cincinnati Open, before going on to lose in the first round at Flushing Meadows to British No. 1 and world No. 13, Johanna Konta. The tour's move onto the European red clay courts brought two further opening-round losses, including at the rescheduled French Open to world No. 49, Fiona Ferro. By 19 October 2020, Watson's ranking had slipped back to No. 60.

Watson won the Battle of the Brits Premier League women's event, held in December 2020.

2021: Birmingham semifinal
The highlight of Watson's 2021 season was a semifinal appearance at the Birmingham Classic, defeating third seed Donna Vekić, 6–4, 6–2, to become just the third Brit player to reach the last four in the Birmingham tournament's 31-year history, following Anne Hobbs in 1984 and Jo Durie in 1992. Watson had a relatively poor showing at the Grand Slam events, losing in the second round of the Australian Open to 21st seed Anett Kontaveit, the first round of the French open to world No. 93, Zarina Diyas, the first round of Wimbledon to world No. 117, Kristie Ahn, and the first round of the US Open to world No. 109, Kaja Juvan. She ended the season ranked 73.

2022: Wimbledon fourth round, BJK Cup semifinalist 
After a tough end to 2021, Watson started off season at the Adelaide International 1 and lost in the first round to an in-form Alja Tomljanović. Watson then played at Adelaide International 2 where she defeated Plipeuch and Kovinic and qualied for the main draw. She then lost to world No. 29, Tamara Zidanšek, in a tight three-set match in which Watson lost the final-set tiebreak 4–7. Watson then played in the main draw at the Australian Open beating Mayar Sherif in a close three-set encounter, before losing to Zidansek in a tight two-set rematch.

After a promising start to the year, Watson went to play qualifying at Dubai, beating world No. 388 Yashina in the first round before losing to Tomjlanovic in three sets. Watson also played qualifying at the Qatar Open with a less promising result, losing to world No. 203, Marina Melnikova, in two sets.

Watson then travelled to America for a week of training before playing the main draw at the Monterrey Open, where she has previously had good results. She won a tough first-round three-setter against Jule Niemeier before losing to Nuria Párrizas Díaz in the second, still seeking to make it past the second round of a main draw.

She moved onto Indian Wells where she entered qualifying as the 20th seed and world No. 113. In the first round, she got a great win over Rebeka Masarova. In the second, she faced Mai Hontama and after going down 4–6, 0–2, Watson played some great tennis for take the match 4–6, 6–2, 6–1 and qualify for the main draw of Indian Wells. However, Watson lost to Tereza Martincová.

Moving onto Miami, Watson had fallen outside the top 100 and was looking to break a six-year losing streak here. She took on Arantxa Rus in the first round where after a 3-hour 25 minute battle, came through three tough sets. She faced 15th seed Elina Svitolina in the second round. Watson was looking to get her first back-to-back March wins since Birmingham in June 2021 and a first top 20 win in two years. After going down a set 4–6, she fought back to take the second 6–3 and after having had a chance to serve for the match, the final set went to a tiebreak which Watson prevailed in 7–4. In the third round, she lost to Belinda Bencic, the 22nd seed, 4–6, 1–6.

Watson started her clay-court season and played at Charleston next, where, after losing in the final qualifying round, she received a lucky loser spot in the main draw only to be knocked out by Claire Liu. She then went onto the Madrid Open where she also lost in the final round of qualifying.

Hoping for more momentum, Watson playing at the WTA 125 event in Saint-Malo. After winning a strong first-round match, she lost to Madison Brengle in the second.

With Roland Garros nearing, Watson was still seeking a WTA Tour main-draw win which she achieved in Strasbourg over Hobgarski. She was beaten by the eighth seed, Magda Linette, in the second round.

Watson moved to Paris for the 2022 French Open, having only one won main-draw match on clay this season. She faced Elsa Jacquemot in the first round where the French-women played an inspired match to knock Watson out in straight sets.

Watson looked to the grass-court season where she has previously had mixed results. Starting at Nottingham, she took on Katie Volynets in the first round. Although Watson needed a medical timeout towards the end of the first set, she battled through in two comfortable sets. In the second round, however, she lost in two sets to Viktoria Golubic following a hamstring injury. This injury caused Watson to pull out of the Birmingham tournament and meant she played qualifying at Eastbourne. Although losing in the final qualifying round, Watson was awarded a lucky loser spot, taking on fellow lucky loser Rebecca Marino in the first round. However, Marino was the prevailing player in two tight sets.

Watson went on to her third major of the year at 2022 Wimbledon Championships, not having won a main-draw match at Wimbledon since 2019. She played Tamara Korpatsch in the first round. Watson lost a tight first-set tiebreaker and was one game away from defeat in the second set. However, Watson fought back to take the second set before the match was suspended for the night due to Wimbledon timing agreements. The players then returned the next day to finish the match where Watson dominated the final set 6–2, getting her through to the second round.
In her 12th attempt Watson finally reached the fourth round at Wimbledon defeating Kaja Juvan, before she unfortunately lost to Jule Niemeier.

Onto the Washington Open where Watson lost in the final qualifying round, and then the Canadian Open where Watson had to retire in the first qualifying round one set down. She continued her North American hardcourt season at the WTA 125 Vancouver Open where she made the second round. In the US Open qualifying, she hoped to turn around her current hardcourt form. Unfortunately, Watson lost in the third round to Sara Bejlek, having controlled the match and being two points away from victory in the second set. Watson ended the year at world number 133, her lowest rank for a number of years.

2023
After a positive finish to 2022 helping the Great Britain team reach the semifinals of the 2022 Billie Jean King Cup, Watson started off her season playing an ITF event in Canberra where she defeated top seed Kateryna Kozlova and fellow Brit Yuriko Miyazaki before going out to eventual champion Katie Boulter.

Watson then made her way to the 2023 Australian Open where she went out in the first round of qualifying. It was the first year since 2012 that she did not play the main draw in Melbourne.

Having not had the most ideal start to the season, Watson then moved on to play at Hua Hin where she drew No. 2 seed Yulia Putintseva in round one. In a close three-set battle, Watson fought past the second seed into the second round. With a win over Han Na-lae, Watson made her first WTA Tour quarterfinal since Birmingham 2021. She unfortunately lost in a tight two setter to the seventh seed Wang Xinyu.

Watson then played in a Glasgow $25k tournament, where she pulled together a run of winning four matches before losing in a three-setter final.

She then made the qualifying draw at the Austin Open where she defeated Jamie Loeb in the first round and María Carlé in the final qualifying round to make the main draw. Looking to build on her success, Watson faced a tricky draw which started with Danka Kovinić, a player ranked roughly 80 places higher than her, but made her way through the first round. Watson went out to 5th seed Stephens in the second round, with the American playing close to perfect baseline tennis. Watson left the week with a solid result to build upon, however, Watson did not gain entry into qualifying for Indian Wells or Miami which raises the question of Watson’s schedule for March and April.

Playing style
Watson is right-handed and plays with a two-handed backhand. Her game is often likened to that of Martina Hingis and she has been praised by Nick Bollettieri for her "amazing footwork". Her on-court intelligence, court sense and timing have been other talking points about her game. According to Nigel Sears, head of women's coaching at the Lawn Tennis Association, Watson possesses "a complete game", with variety including a consistent one-handed backhand slice, volleys and angles. Her game has been described as similar to ATP player Jo-Wilfried Tsonga due to her "big serve" and athleticism.

Upon Watson reaching the 2011 French Open second round, Andy Murray commented "When I saw her for the first time, I thought she was good. I like the way she moves on the court. She's very balanced". Bollettieri stated that Watson's "game is based on great movement, but she's not afraid to whack the ball. She's not easy to beat. She has very good ground strokes, though she can over-hit and strike the ball a little too flat at times".

Playing equipment
In 2011, Watson used the Dunlop Biomimetic 300 Tour tennis racquet,
and has also played with, and endorsed, the Dunlop Srixon CX 200 LS. Since the end of 2020, Watson has started to use the Babolat Pure Strike racquet, that she used in 2016 and 2017 as well.

Personal life
From 2016 to 2018, Watson was in a relationship with fellow tennis player Lloyd Glasspool. Between 2019 and 2022, she was in a relationship with Yeovil Town and Morecambe footballer Courtney Duffus.

Career statistics

Grand Slam performance timelines

Singles

Doubles

Mixed doubles

Grand Slam tournament finals

Mixed doubles: 2 (1 title, 1 runner-up)

References

External links

 
 
 
 Heather Watson profile at CoreTennis
 

1992 births
Living people
Sportspeople from Bradenton, Florida
British expatriates in the United States
British people of Papua New Guinean descent
British female tennis players
Guernsey tennis players
Guernsey sportswomen
Association footballers' wives and girlfriends
Tennis players at the 2010 Commonwealth Games
US Open (tennis) junior champions
Tennis players at the 2012 Summer Olympics
Tennis players at the 2016 Summer Olympics
Tennis players at the 2020 Summer Olympics
Olympic tennis players of Great Britain
Grand Slam (tennis) champions in girls' singles
Wimbledon champions
Grand Slam (tennis) champions in mixed doubles
Commonwealth Games competitors for Guernsey
Hopman Cup competitors
People from Saint Peter Port